Zachariah Cantey House, also known as Buckton, is a historic home located near Camden, Kershaw County, South Carolina. It was built about 1795, and is a rectangular, -story Federal hall and parlor dwelling.  It has a hewn-timber braced frame; beaded weatherboard siding; a tall, brick pier foundation and a gable roof. Zachariah Cantey was a prominent local planter, businessman, and politician.

It was listed on the National Register of Historic Places in 1983.

References

Houses on the National Register of Historic Places in South Carolina
Federal architecture in South Carolina
Houses completed in 1795
Houses in Kershaw County, South Carolina
National Register of Historic Places in Kershaw County, South Carolina